Clement Arundel Newton-Brown  (born 3 September 1967) is an Australian former politician who served as the member for Prahran in the Victorian Legislative Assembly.

Political career 

Prior to his election, he worked as a barrister, specialising in planning law as well as running a series of small businesses—including the first Yarra River water taxi service, BBQ Boats and a café on an island under the Southgate footbridge. He was elected the youngest ever Deputy Lord Mayor of Melbourne in 1999 at 32 years of age.

Newton-Brown stood for the seat of Prahran in 2006 but was unsuccessful. At the 2010 Victorian election, he ran a high-profile campaign and defeated two-term Labor Party member, Tony Lupton. He lost the seat at the 2014 Victorian election to the Greens candidate Sam Hibbins. It was only the second Victorian Lower House seat to be won by the Greens.

Post Politics 

From 2018 onwards, he founded Skyportz, a company working on urban infrastructure for flying taxis.

Personal life 
Newton-Brown was born in Hawthorn and is a long-term resident of Prahran. He graduated with a degrees in Law and Arts from Monash University in 1991. In 2019 he was awarded a Medal of the Order of Australia (OAM) for services to the Victorian Parliament and the community of Melbourne.

Clem is married with 3 teenage children.

References

1967 births
Living people
Australian barristers
Victoria (Australia) local councillors
Members of the Victorian Legislative Assembly
Politicians from Melbourne
Liberal Party of Australia members of the Parliament of Victoria
Monash University alumni
Alumni of the University of Edinburgh
21st-century Australian politicians
Recipients of the Medal of the Order of Australia
People from Hawthorn, Victoria
Businesspeople from Melbourne
People from Prahran, Victoria